The 2012–13 Liechtenstein Cup was the sixty-eight season of Liechtenstein's annual cup competition. Seven clubs competed with a total of sixteen teams for one spot in the first qualifying round of the 2013–14 UEFA Europa League. USV Eschen/Mauren were the defending champions.

First round
The First Round featured eight teams. In this round entered seven of the reserve clubs participating in the competition, along with FC Ruggell. The games were played on 21 and 22 August 2012.

|colspan="3" style="background-color:#99CCCC"|

|-
|colspan="3" style="background-color:#99CCCC"|

|}

Second round
The four winners of the First Round, along with FC Schaan, FC Schaan Azzurri, FC Triesen and FC Balzers II competed in the Second Round. The games were played on 26 September and 2 and 3 October 2012.

|colspan="3" style="background-color:#99CCCC"|

|-
|colspan="3" style="background-color:#99CCCC"|

|-
|colspan="3" style="background-color:#99CCCC"|

|}

Quarter-finals
The four winners of the Second Round entered the quarter-finals, along with the semifinalists from last season's competitions: FC Vaduz, USV Eschen/Mauren, FC Balzers and FC Triesenberg. The games were played on 6 November 2012.

|colspan="3" style="background-color:#99CCCC"|

|-
|colspan="3" style="background-color:#99CCCC"|

|}

Semi-finals
The four winners of the quarter-finals competed in the semi-finals. The games will be played on 30 March and 17 April 2013.

|colspan="3" style="background-color:#99CCCC"|

|-
|colspan="3" style="background-color:#99CCCC"|

|}

Final
The final was played in the national stadium, Rheinpark Stadion.

References

External links
 
 RSSSF

Liechtenstein Football Cup seasons
Cup
Liechtenstein Cup